The Funky 16 Corners is a compilation of funk songs and instrumentals recorded by little-known performers from across the United States during the late 1960s and the early and mid 1970s.  The album, released on Stones Throw Records in 2001, pays homage to these forgotten funk bands and musicians.

Track listing
 "Intro" - 0:43
 Performed by Ebony Rhythm Band
 "Dap Walk" - 3:05
 Performed by Ernie & The Top Notes
 "Let's Go (It's Summertime)" - 2:45
 Performed by James Reese & The Progressions
 "Trespasser" - 5:49
 Performed by Bad Medicine
 "The Funky 16 Corners" - 5:18
 Performed by The Highlighters Band
 "The Kick" - 6:20
 Performed by The Rhythm Machine
 "What About You (In The World Today)" - 2:51
 Performed by Co Real Artists
 "Interlude" - 0:40
 Performed by Ebony Rhythm Band
 "The Dump" - 2:41
 Performed by Soul Vibrations
 "Jody's Freeze" - 2:55
 Performed by James Reese & The Progressions
 "Kashmere" - 4:57
 Performed by Kashmere Stage Band
 "Fish Head" - 2:35
 Performed by Slim & The Soulful Saints
 "Tighten Up Tighter" - 2:13
 Performed by Billy Ball & The Upsetters featuring Roosevelt Matthews
 "Southside Funk" - 4:12
 Performed by The Soul Seven
 "Can We Rap" - 2:13
 Performed by Carleen & The Groovers
 "Beautiful Day" 2:51
 Performed by Spider Harrison
 "Go To Work [Alternate Version]" 3:43
 Performed by Revolution Compared To What
 "The Phantom" - 2:19
 Performed by Bubbha Thomas & The Lightmen Plus One
 "In The Rain" 4:39
 Performed by The Wooden Glass featuring Billy Wooten
 "Outro" 1:08
 Performed by Ebony Rhythm Band
 "Bunky's Pick [Bonus Track]" 7:25
 Performed by Cut Chemist
 "The Funky Buzzard [Bonus Track]" 2:23
 Performed by James Bell & The Turner Brothers

Credits
 Executive producer: Peanut Butter Wolf
 Mastering: Gene Grimaldi, Matt Mahaffey
 Engineering: George Day, Harry Deal & the Galaxies, Bob Edwards, Otis Forrest, Joel Johnson
 Editing: Gene Grimaldi
 Drums: Ron Anderson, Harold Cardwell, Leon "Ndugu" Chancler, Richard Clarke, Dwayne "Buzzard" Garvin, Willie Hill, Bubbha Thomas, Matthew R. Watson, Cliff Williams, Dino Zimmerman
 Tenor saxophone: Larry Blake, Joe Hardy, Doug Harris, Teddy Patterson, Leslie Pippens
 Alto saxophone: Martin Williams
 Soprano saxophone: Doug Harris
 Saxophone: Doug Harris, Jim Honeycutt, Jesse Jones Jr., George Miller, David Morton, Clyde Walker
 Guitar: Jamie Brantley, Lee Martin, John Scott, Rob Townsend, Ernest Williams, Dino Zimmerman
 Trumpet: Clarence Butler, Carlos, Ronnie Davis, Freddie Green, Michael "Mike Dee" Johnson, Audrey Jones, William Perry, Soup, John Thomas, Pat Williams
 Bass: Tony Davis, Greg Johnson, Lester "Lammy" Johnson, David Stevens
 Flute: Marsha Frazier
 Piano: Marsha Frazier
 Electric piano: Marsha Frazier
 Trombone: Charles Hunt, Alexander J. Nichols, James Reese, Jimmy Walker
 Conga: Munyungo Jackson
 Organ: James Reese, Emanuel Riggins
 Vibraphone: Billy Wooten

References

External links 
 The Funky 16 Corners on Stones Throw
 Stones Throw Records official site

2001 compilation albums
Stones Throw Records compilation albums
Soul compilation albums
Deep funk compilation albums